Indrek Visnapuu (born 4 May 1976) is an Estonian basketball coach and former player, who last coached Audentes/Noortekoondis of the Korvpalli Meistriliiga (KML).

Playing career
Visnapuu made his Korvpalli Meistriliiga debut on 2 October 1993 with Tartu.

In 1997, Visnapuu joined Polaris (University of Tartu). He won his first Estonian Championship in the 1999–2000 season.

In 2000, he signed for Hotronic.

In 2003, Visnapuu signed for TTÜ/A. Le Coq.

Coaching career
Visnapuu's coaching career began in 2002, when he became an assistant coach at TTÜ/A. Le Coq, while he was still an active 26-year-old player.

From 2005 to 2007, Visnapuu served as the head coach of the Estonian national under-18 basketball team and from 2005 to 2006, as the assistant coach of the Estonian men's national basketball team.

In 2007, Visnapuu became an assistant coach at his former team University of Tartu. On 20 December 2008, he replaced Üllar Kerde as the head coach. On 14 May 2010, Visnapuu won the Estonian Championship with Tartu, after defeating Rakvere Tarvas 4 games to 2 in the finals. On 24 January 2012, Visnapuu resigned from the team.

In September 2012, he became the head coach of Audentes/Noortekoondis.

Awards and accomplishments

Playing achievements
University of Tartu
 Estonian League champion: 2000
 Estonian Cup champion: 2000

Coaching achievements
TTÜ/A. Le Coq
 Estonian Cup champion: 2003 (assistant coach)

University of Tartu
 Estonian League champion: 2008 (assistant coach), 2010
 Estonian Cup champion: 2009, 2010, 2011
 BBL Cup champion: 2010

References

External links
 Indrek Visnapuu at basket.ee 

1976 births
Living people
Estonian men's basketball players
Point guards
Tartu Ülikool/Rock players
Estonian basketball coaches
Sportspeople from Tartu